The 2021–22 Oklahoma City Thunder season was the 14th season of the franchise in Oklahoma City and the 56th in the National Basketball Association (NBA).

The Thunder were officially eliminated from playoff contention for the second consecutive season. It was the first time the team suffered consecutive losing seasons since 2006–2009 where they went on a four–year stretch.

Previous season 
The Thunder finished the 2020–21 season 22–50 to finish in fourth place in the Northwest Division, fourteenth in the Western Conference and failed to qualify for the playoffs for the first time since 2014-15. 

In their first year of the rebuild, the Thunder started the season returning only six players from the 2019-20 season. The Thunder also mutually agreed to part ways with head coach Billy Donovan after five seasons. To replace Donovan, the Thunder promoted assistant coach Mark Daigneault who previously served as the head coach of the Oklahoma City Blue.

Replacing Chris Paul, Danilo Gallinari, and Steven Adams in the starting lineup, the Thunder started veterans George Hill, Al Horford and promoted second-year forward Darius Bazley. After failing to trade Horford at the deadline, the Thunder announced Horford will remain inactive for the rest of the season to prioritize the team's younger talent. After Shai Gilgeous-Alexander's season-ending injury and Al Horford being shut down, the Thunder finished April and May with a 2-23 record including a 152-95 loss to the Indiana Pacers which was the largest home loss in league history.

Offseason

Draft picks

The Thunder had three first round-picks and three second-round picks entering the draft. The Thunder owned one first-round pick entering the 2021 NBA Draft lottery. The Thunder ended the night with the sixth overall pick after having a 34.1% chance to be in the top three. The Thunder other's first rounders were acquired from the Al Horford trade and the Paul George trade. The Thunder also acquired two other second-round picks from the Kelly Oubre Jr. trade.

On draft night, the Thunder traded the draft rights to Alperen Şengün, the 16th pick, to the Houston Rockets in exchange for a 2022 protected first-round pick via DET and a 2023 protected first-round pick via WAS. 
The Thunder traded the draft rights to Rokas Jokubaitis, the 34th pick, and the draft rights to Miles McBride, the 36th pick to the New York Knicks in exchange for the draft rights to Jeremiah Robinson-Earl, the 32nd pick. 

The Thunder ended 2021 NBA Draft night with Australia's NBL guard Josh Giddey, Florida guard Tre Mann, Villanova center Jeremiah Robinson-Earl and Maryland guard Aaron Wiggins.

Trades
On June 18, the Thunder traded Al Horford, Moses Brown and a 2023 second-round pick to the Boston Celtics in exchange for Kemba Walker, a 2021 first-round pick and a 2025 second-round pick. On August 6, the Thunder negotiated a contract buyout and waived Walker. In return, Walker gave up $20 million in total in his buyout. Walker gave up $9.7 million in his 2021-22 salary and $10.2 million in his 2022-23 salary.

On July 30, the Thunder traded a 2027 second-round pick and cash considerations to the Utah Jazz in exchange for Derrick Favors and a future first-round pick.

Free agency

For this offseason, free agency began on August 2, 2021. Tony Bradley, Svi Mykhailiuk and Mike Muscala were set to hit unrestricted free agency while Josh Hall was set to his restricted free agency. On August 2, it was reported that Mike Muscala agreed to a two-year, $7 million deal to stay with the Thunder, which he later signed on August 11. On August 18, Josh Hall accepted his two-way qualifying offer to re-sign with the Thunder. However, on September 12, the Thunder waived Hall. On August 19, Tony Bradley signed a deal with the Chicago Bulls. On September 11, Svi Mykhailiuk signed a deal with the Toronto Raptors. On August 2, it was reported that Shai Gilgeous-Alexander agreed to a five-year, $172 million rookie extension with the Thunder, which he later signed on August 6.

On September 3, Vít Krejčí signed a rookie deal with the Thunder. Krejčí was originally selected 37th overall in the 2020 NBA Draft but did not sign a contract in the 2020-21 season, instead spent the season rehabbing with the Oklahoma City Blue after tearing his ACL. On September 15, Paul Watson Jr. signed a two-way contract with the Thunder. Watson Jr. spent the 2020-21 season with the Toronto Raptors.

On September 26, Charlie Brown Jr. was waived by the Thunder.

Front office and coaching changes
On August 10, the Thunder announced Nick Collison as a special assistant to Sam Presti. Prior to taking this position, Collison served as a basketball operations representative for the Thunder. Collison joins Eric Maynor, Nazr Mohammed, Mike Milks and Anthony Morrow as former Thunder players contributing to the Thunder organization.

Roster

Staff

Standings

Division

Conference

Game log

Preseason 

|-  style="background:#fcc;"
| 1
| October 4
| Charlotte  
| 
| Josh Giddey (18)
| Josh Giddey (7)
| Gilgeous-Alexander & Maledon (4)
| Paycom Center
| 0–1
|-  style="background:#fcc;"
| 2
| October 10
| @ Milwaukee 
| 
| Luguentz Dort (19)
| D. J. Wilson (7)
| Giddey, Gilgeous-Alexander (6)
| Fiserv Forum12,442
| 0–2
|-  style="background:#cfc;"
| 3
| October 13
| Denver
| 
| Darius Bazley (16)
| Darius Bazley (8)
| Shai Gilgeous-Alexander (4)
| Paycom Center
| 1–2
|- style="background:#fcc;"
| 4
| October 14
| Denver  
| 
| Aleksej Pokusevski (22)
| Gabriel Deck (11)
| Josh Giddey (8)
| BOK Center
| 1–3

Regular season 

|-  style="background:#fcc;"
| 1
| October 20
| @ Utah   
| 
| Shai Gilgeous-Alexander (18)
| Josh Giddey (10)
| Giddey, Pokusevski, Maledon (3)
| Vivint Arena18,306
| 0–1
|-  style="background:#fcc;"
| 2
| October 22
| @ Houston   
|  
| Shai Gilgeous-Alexander (13)
| Aleksej Pokusevski (7)
| Dort, Giddey (4)
| Toyota Center15,674
| 0–2
|-  style="background:#fcc;"
| 3
| October 24
| Philadelphia  
| 
| Shai Gilgeous-Alexander (29)
| Josh Giddey (8)
| Shai Gilgeous-Alexander (8)
| Paycom Center14,256
| 0–3
|-  style="background:#fcc;"
| 4
| October 26
| Golden State  
| 
| Shai Gilgeous-Alexander (30)
| Josh Giddey (9)
| Giddey, Gilgeous-Alexander (4)
| Paycom Center15,717
| 0–4
|-  style="background:#cfc;"
| 5
| October 27
| LA Lakers    
| 
| Shai Gilgeous-Alexander (27)
| Shai Gilgeous-Alexander (9)
| Josh Giddey (10)
| Paycom Center15,783
| 1–4
|-  style="background:#fcc;"
| 6
| October 30
| @ Golden State 
| 
| Shai Gilgeous-Alexander (15)
| Darius Bazley (8)
| Josh Giddey (6)
| Chase Center18,063
| 1–5

|-  style="background:#fcc;"
| 7
| November 1
| @ LA Clippers 
| 
| Shai Gilgeous-Alexander (28)
| Maledon, Muscala, Gilgeous-Alexander (7)
| Josh Giddey (7)
| Staples Center13,722
| 1–6
|-  style="background:#cfc;"
| 8
| November 4
| @ LA Lakers 
|  
| Shai Gilgeous-Alexander (28)
| Derrick Favors (11)
| Josh Giddey (8)
| Staples Center18,997
| 2–6
|-  style="background:#cfc;"
| 9
| November 7
| San Antonio 
| 
| Mike Muscala (20)
| Darius Bazley (11)
| Shai Gilgeous-Alexander (9)
| Paycom Center12,972
| 3–6
|-  style="background:#cfc;"
| 10
| November 10
| @ New Orleans 
| 
| Luguentz Dort (27)
| Josh Giddey (12)
| Josh Giddey (9)
| Smoothie King Center15,355
| 4–6
|-  style="background:#cfc;"
| 11
| November 12
| Sacramento
| 
| Dort, Gilgeous-Alexander (22)
| Jeremiah Robinson-Earl (14)
| Josh Giddey (5)
| Paycom Center12,881
| 5–6
|-  style="background:#fcc;"
| 12
| November 14
| Brooklyn
| 
| Shai Gilgeous-Alexander (23)
| Jeremiah Robinson-Earl (8)
| Giddey, Wiggins (4)
| Paycom Center15,080
| 5–7
|-  style="background:#fcc;"
| 13
| November 15
| Miami 
| 
| Luguentz Dort (20)
| Darius Bazley (7)
| Shai Gilgeous-Alexander (5)
| Paycom Center12,330
| 5–8
|-  style="background:#cfc;"
| 14
| November 17
| Houston  
|  
| Luguentz Dort (34)
| Josh Giddey (11)
| Shai Gilgeous-Alexander (9)
| Paycom Center12,066
| 6–8
|-  style="background:#fcc;"
| 15
| November 19
| @ Milwaukee  
|  
| Shai Gilgeous-Alexander (17)
| Josh Giddey (12)
| Giddey, Williams (4)
| Fiserv Forum17,341
| 6–9
|-  style="background:#fcc;"
| 16
| November 20
| @ Boston 
|  
| Luguentz Dort (16)
| Darius Bazley (10)
| Darius Bazley (6)
| TD Garden19,156
| 6–10
|-  style="background:#fcc;"
| 17
| November 22
| @ Atlanta  
| 
| Dort, Giddey, Jerome (15)
| Jeremiah Robinson-Earl (10)
| Josh Giddey (8)
| State Farm Arena15,806
| 6–11
|- style="background:#fcc;"
| 18
| November 24
| Utah
| 
| Luguentz Dort (27)
| Jeremiah Robinson-Earl (10)
| Josh Giddey (8)
| Paycom Center17,341
| 6–12
|-  style="background:#fcc;"
| 19
| November 26
| Washington 
| 
| Luguentz Dort (21)
| Shai Gilgeous-Alexander (8)
| Shai Gilgeous-Alexander (9)
| Paycom Center14,579
| 6–13
|-  style="background:#fcc;"
| 20
| November 29
| @ Houston 
| 
| Shai Gilgeous-Alexander (22)
| Mann, Robinson-Earl (7)
| Josh Giddey (7)
| Toyota Center12,829
| 6–14

|-  style="background:#fcc;"
| 21
| December 1
| Houston 
| 
| Shai Gilgeous-Alexander (39) 
| Jeremiah Robinson-Earl (9)
| Dort, Robinson-Earl (4)
| Paycom Center13,222
| 6–15
|-  style="background:#fcc;"
| 22
| December 2
| @ Memphis 
| 
| Luguentz Dort (15)
| Muscala, Robinson-Earl (5)
| Ty Jerome (4)
| FedExForum13,103
| 6–16
|-  style="background:#cfc;"
| 23
| December 6 
| @ Detroit 
| 
| Shai Gilgeous-Alexander (30)
| Bazley, Robinson-Earl (8)
| Shai Gilgeous-Alexander (13)
| Little Caesars Arena 10,522
| 7–16
|-  style="background:#cfc;"
| 24
| December 8 
| @ Toronto
| 
| Shai Gilgeous-Alexander (26)
| Derrick Favors (9)
| Shai Gilgeous-Alexander (9)
| Scotiabank Arena19,800
| 8–16
|-  style="background:#fcc;"
| 25
| December 10
| LA Lakers 
|  
| Tre Mann (19)
| Jeremiah Robinson-Earl (9)
| Josh Giddey (7)
| Paycom Center16,523
| 8–17
|-  style="background:#fcc;"
| 26
| December 12
| Dallas 
| 
| Shai Gilgeous-Alexander (18)
| Aleksej Pokusevski (9)
| Shai Gilgeous-Alexander (5)
| Paycom Center15,747
| 8–18
|- style="background:#fcc;"
| 27
| December 15
| New Orleans  
| 
| Shai Gilgeous-Alexander (33)
| Josh Giddey (9)
| Josh Giddey (7)
| Paycom Center13,253
| 8–19
|-  style="background:#cfc;"
| 28
| December 18
| LA Clippers  
| 
| Luguentz Dort (29)
| Josh Giddey (10)
| Josh Giddey (18) 
| Paycom Center15,123
| 9–19
|-  style="background:#cfc;"
| 29
| December 20
| @ Memphis  
|  
| Shai Gilgeous-Alexander (23)
| Shai Gilgeous-Alexander (7)
| Josh Giddey (11) 
| FedEx Forum15,721
| 10–19
|-  style="background:#cfc;"
| 30
| December 22
| Denver 
|  
| Shai Gilgeous-Alexander (27)
| Bazley, Gilgeous-Alexander (11)
| Shai Gilgeous-Alexander (12)
| Paycom Center14,932
| 11–19
|-  style="background:#fcc;"
| 31
| December 23
| @ Phoenix  
| 
| Shai Gilgeous-Alexander (29)
| Darius Bazley (10)
| Shai Gilgeous-Alexander (7)
| Footprint Center17,071
| 11–20
|-  style="background:#cfc;"
| 32
| December 26
| New Orleans 
|  
| Shai Gilgeous-Alexander (31)
| Josh Giddey (10)
| Josh Giddey (10)
| Paycom Center15,608
| 12–20
|-  style="background:#fcc;"
| 33
| December 28
| @ Sacramento  
|  
| Shai Gilgeous-Alexander (33)
| Dort, Williams (8)
| Shai Gilgeous-Alexander (5)
| Golden 1 Center14,750
| 12–21
|-  style="background:#fcc;"
| 34
| December 29
| @ Phoenix 
| 
| Ty Jerome (24)
| Jerome, Wiggins (8)
| Ty Jerome (5)
| Footprint Center17,071
| 12–22
|-  style="background:#cfc;"
| 35
| December 31
| New York  
|  
| Shai Gilgeous-Alexander (23)
| Isaiah Roby (9)
| Ty Jerome (5)
| Paycom Center16,451
| 13–22

|-  style="background:#fcc;"
| 36
| January 2
| Dallas  
| 
| Josh Giddey (17)
| Josh Giddey (13)
| Josh Giddey (14)
| Paycom Center14,571
| 13–23
|-  style="background:#fcc;"
| 37
| January 5 
| @ Minnesota 
| 
| Shai Gilgeous-Alexander (19)
| Shai Gilgeous-Alexander (15)
| Shai Gilgeous-Alexander (6)
| Target Center14,375
| 13–24
|-  style="background:#fcc;"
| 38
| January 7
| Minnesota 
| 
| Luguentz Dort (18)
| Jeremiah Robinson-Earl (8)
| Shai Gilgeous-Alexander (6)
| Paycom Center14,874
| 13–25
|-  style="background:#fcc;"
| 39
| January 9 
| Denver 
|  
| Luguentz Dort (14) 
| Josh Giddey (7)
| Josh Giddey (8)
| Paycom Center14,772
| 13–26
|-  style="background:#fcc;"
| 40
| January 11
| @ Washington 
| 
| Shai Gilgeous-Alexander (32)
| Darius Bazley (9)
| Giddey, Gilgeous-Alexander (8)
| Capital One Arena13,985
| 13–27
|-  style="background:#cfc;"
| 41
| January 13
| @ Brooklyn   
| 
| Shai Gilgeous-Alexander (33)
| Shai Gilgeous-Alexander (10)
| Shai Gilgeous-Alexander (9)
| Barclays Center16,964
| 14–27
|-  style="background:#fcc;"
| 42
| January 15 
| Cleveland   
| 
| Shai Gilgeous-Alexander (21)
| Jeremiah Robinson-Earl (11)
| Shai Gilgeous-Alexander (7)
| Paycom Center15,284
| 14–28
|-  style="background:#fcc;"
| 43
| January 17 
| @ Dallas   
| 
| Shai Gilgeous-Alexander (34)
| Luguentz Dort (7)
| Dort, Giddey (7)
| American Airlines Center19,266
| 14–29
|-  style="background:#fcc;"
| 44
| January 19 
| @ San Antonio 
| 
| Aaron Wiggins (19)
| Josh Giddey (11)
| Josh Giddey (8)
| AT&T Center11,848
| 14–30
|-  style="background:#fcc;"
| 45
| January 21 
| @ Charlotte
|  
| Shai Gilgeous-Alexander (29)
| Jeremiah Robinson-Earl (11)
| Shai Gilgeous-Alexander (6)
| Paycom Center15,835
| 14–31
|-  style="background:#fcc;"
| 46
| January 22
| @ Cleveland   
|  
| Shai Gilgeous-Alexander (29)
| Shai Gilgeous-Alexander (9)
| Shai Gilgeous-Alexander (6)
| Rocket Mortgage FieldHouse19,432
| 14–32
|-  style="background:#fcc;"
| 47
| January 24 
| Chicago   
|  
| Shai Gilgeous-Alexander (31) 
| Bazley, Giddey (8)
| Shai Gilgeous-Alexander (10)
| Paycom Center14,378
| 14–33
|-  style="background:#fcc;"
| 48
| January 28 
| Indiana   
| 
| Luguentz Dort (27)
| Josh Giddey (10)
| Josh Giddey (5)
| Paycom Center15,106
| 14–34
|-  style="background:#cfc;"
| 49
| January 31
| Portland   
|  
| Luguentz Dort (18)
| Josh Giddey (12)
| Ty Jerome (6)
| Paycom Center13,812
| 15–34

|-  style="background:#cfc;"
| 50
| February 2
| @ Dallas   
|  
| Luguentz Dort (30)
| Darius Bazley (11)
| Josh Giddey (10)
| American Airlines Center19,200
| 16–34
|-  style="background:#cfc;"
| 51
| February 4 
| @ Portland   
| 
| Luguentz Dort (23)
| Darius Bazley (12)
| Ty Jerome (8)
| Moda Center15,329
| 17–34
|-  style="background:#fcc;"
| 52
| February 5 
| @ Sacramento 
| 
| Josh Giddey (24)
| Aleksej Pokusevski (9)
| Josh Giddey (8)
| Golden 1 Center14,097
| 17–35
|-  style="background:#fcc;"
| 53
| February 7 
| Golden State    
| 
| Luguentz Dort (26)
| Josh Giddey (11)
| Josh Giddey (7)
| Paycom Center17,009
| 17–36
|-  style="background:#fcc;"
| 54
| February 9 
| Toronto    
| 
| Pokusevski, Maledon (18)
| Kenrich Williams (12)
| Giddey, Williams (6)
| Paycom Center13,858
| 17–37
|-  style="background:#fcc;"
| 55
| February 11
| @ Philadelphia   
|  
| Derrick Favors (16)
| Darius Bazley (15)
| Giddey, Jerome (5)
| Wells Fargo Center20,669
| 17–38
|-  style="background:#fcc;"
| 56
| February 12
| @ Chicago 
| 
| Luguentz Dort (31)
| Josh Giddey (12)
| Josh Giddey (10)
| United Center20,072
| 17–39
|-  style="background:#cfc;"
| 57
| February 14 
| @ New York  
| 
| Tre Mann (30)
| Josh Giddey (11)
| Josh Giddey (12)
| Madison Square Garden18,433
| 18–39
|-  style="background:#fcc;"
| 58
| February 16
| San Antonio 
|  
| Tre Mann (24)
| Isaiah Roby (12)
| Josh Giddey (10)
| Paycom Center14,920
| 18–40
|- align="center"
|colspan="9" bgcolor="#bbcaff"|All-Star Break
|-  style="background:#fcc;"
| 59
| February 24
| Phoenix 
|  
| Shai Gilgeous-Alexander (32)
| Josh Giddey (9)
| Giddey, Mann (6)
| Paycom Center14,176
| 18–41
|-  style="background:#cfc;"
| 60
| February 25
| @ Indiana
|  
| Shai Gilgeous-Alexander (36)
| Isaiah Roby (11)
| Gilgeous-Alexander, Mann (5)
| Gainbridge Fieldhouse15,182
| 19–41
|-  style="background:#fcc;"
| 61
| February 28
| Sacramento  
|  
| Shai Gilgeous-Alexander (37)
| Aleksej Pokusevski (8)
| Shai Gilgeous-Alexander (10)
| Paycom Center13,945
| 19–42

|-  style="background:#cfc;"
| 62
| March 2
| @ Denver  
| 
| Shai Gilgeous-Alexander (29)
| Aleksej Pokusevski (11)
| Gilgeous-Alexander, Roby (5)
| Ball Arena15,167
| 20–42
|-  style="background:#fcc;"
| 63
|March 4
| Minnesota
|  
| Shai Gilgeous-Alexander (33)
| Isaiah Roby (10)
| Shai Gilgeous-Alexander (7)
| Paycom Center15,180
| 20–43
|-  style="background:#fcc;"
| 64
| March 6
| Utah  
|   
| Shai Gilgeous-Alexander (33) 
| Aleksej Pokusevski (11)
| Shai Gilgeous-Alexander (8)
| Paycom Center15,079
| 20–44
|-  style="background:#fcc;"
| 65
| March 8
| Milwaukee 
|  
| Shai Gilgeous-Alexander (33)
| Shai Gilgeous-Alexander (8)
| Shai Gilgeous-Alexander (14)
| Paycom Center15,743
| 20–45
|- style="background:#fcc;"
| 66
| March 9 
| @ Minnesota  
|    
| Aaron Wiggins (25)
| Aaron Wiggins (9)
| Shai Gilgeous-Alexander (8)
| Target Center16,191
| 20–46
|-  style="background:#fcc;"
| 67
| March 13
| Memphis
|  
| Shai Gilgeous-Alexander (31)
| Darius Bazley (10)
| Shai Gilgeous-Alexander (7)
| Paycom Center17,482
| 20–47
|-  style="background:#fcc;"
| 68
| March 14
| Charlotte  
|
|Shai Gilgeous-Alexander (32)
| Shai Gilgeous-Alexander (8)
| Tre Mann (6)
| Paycom Center 15,810
| 20–48
|-  style="background:#fcc;"
| 69
| March 16
| @ San Antonio
|  
| Shai Gilgeous-Alexander (34)
| Darius Bazley (9)
| Gilgeous-Alexander, Maledon (9)
| AT&T Center14,994
| 20–49
|-  style="background:#fcc;"
| 70
| March 18
| @ Miami  
|  
| Shai Gilgeous-Alexander (26)
| Aleksej Pokusevski (15)
| Aleksej Pokusevski (5)
| FTX Arena19,600
| 20–50
|-  style="background:#fcc;"
| 71
| March 20 
| @ Orlando 
|  
| Darius Bazley (18)
| Isaiah Roby (10)
| Aleksej Pokusevski (5)
| Amway Center15,012
| 20–51
|-  style="background:#fcc;"
| 72
| March 21 
| Boston  
|  
| Tre Mann (35)
| Darius Bazley (10)
| Shai Gilgeous-Alexander (9)
| Paycom Center15,345
| 20–52
|-  style="background:#cfc;"
| 73
| March 23
| Orlando  
|  
| Theo Maledon (25)
| Vit Krejci (11)
| Theo Maledon (6)
| Paycom Center14,393
| 21–52
|-  style="background:#fcc;"
| 74
| March 26
| @ Denver   
| 
| Theo Maledon (20)
| Isaiah Roby (7)
| Vit Krejci (6)
| Ball Arena 19,520
| 21–53
|-  style="background:#cfc;"
| 75
| March 28 
| @ Portland  
| 
| Isaiah Roby (30)
| Theo Maledon (10)
| Aleksej Pokusevski (11)
| Moda Center18,188
|22–53
|-  style="background:#fcc;"
| 76
| March 30 
| Atlanta   
| 
| Lindy Waters III (25)
| Roby, Sarr (9)
| Theo Maledon (8)
| Paycom Center15,595
|22–54

|-  style="background:#fcc;"
| 77
| April 1 
| Detroit   
| 
|Theo Maledon (28)
|Jaylen Hoard (20)
|Theo Maledon (6)
| Paycom Center16,961
|22–55
|-  style="background:#cfc;"
| 78
| April 3 
| Phoenix  
| 
| Olivier Sarr (24)
| Aleksej Pokusevski (10)
| Aleksej Pokusevski (12)
| Paycom Center17,078
|23–55
|-  style="background:#cfc;"
| 79
| April 5
| Portland   
|  
| Jaylen Hoard (24)
| Jaylen Hoard (21)
| Zavier Simpson (5)
| Paycom Center14,674
|24–55 
|-  style="background:#fcc;"
| 80
| April 6 
| @ Utah   
|  
| Jaylen Hoard (23) 
| Vit Krejčí (6)
| Zavier Simpson (11)
| Vivint Arena 18,306
|24–56
|-  style="background:#fcc;"
| 81
| April 8
| @ LA Lakers  
|  
| Jaylen Hoard (27) 
| Jaylen Hoard (17) 
| Zavier Simpson (7)
| Staples Center18,997
|24–57
|-  style="background:#fcc;"
| 82
| April 10
| @ LA Clippers   
| 
|Simpson & Kalaitzakis (17)
|Jaylen Hoard (15)
| Zavier Simpson (8)
| Staples Center 18,210
|24–58

Player statistics

Regular season

 Led team in statistic
After all games.
‡ Waived during the season
† Traded during the season
≠ Acquired during the season

Individual game highs

Awards and records

Awards

Records
On December 2, 2021, the Oklahoma City Thunder took a 73-point loss against the Memphis Grizzlies setting an NBA-record for the worst margin of loss in history.
On December 27, 2021, Josh Giddey became the second player in NBA history to record a double-double while also going scoreless (Norm Van Lier).
On January 2, 2022, Giddey became the youngest player in NBA history to record a triple-double with 17 points, 13 rebounds, and 14 assists at 19 years and 84 days, surpassing the record set by LaMelo Ball last season. Giddey also became the youngest player in NBA history to lead all players in points, rebounds, and assists in one game, becoming the second teenager to do so along with Luka Dončić.
On February 14, 2022, Giddey became the 7th rookie in NBA history to record back-to-back triple-doubles following a triple-double in Chicago the prior day. Giddey also became the third rookie to record a triple-double in his Madison Square Garden debut.
On February 16, 2022, Giddey, 19, joined Oscar Robertson as the only rookies in league history to record three consecutive triple-doubles.
On March 21, 2022, Tre Mann set a Thunder rookie record with 35 points on 13-20 shooting, 7 threes. Mann scored 23 of his 35 points on a perfect 6-6 shooting in a single quarter marking the new Thunder rookie record for points in a quarter. 
On March 28, 2022, all five Thunder starters made two or more 3-pointers for the first time in OKC history.
On April 1, 2022, Jaylen Hoard became the sixth Thunder player to record a 20-rebound game.
On April 3, 2022, Aleksej Pokuševski became the 12th youngest player in NBA history to record a triple-double with 17 points, 10 rebounds, and 12 assists at 20 years and 98 days old.
On April 5, 2022, Hoard became the seventh player in OKC history to post a 20-point, 20-rebound game and the fifth to record multiple 20-rebound performances.

Transactions

Overview

Trades

Free agency

Re-signed

Additions

Subtractions

Notes

References

2018-19
Oklahoma City Thunder
Oklahoma City Thunder
Oklahoma City Thunder